Runners were a short-lived Australian pop rock band formed in 1980. The group released one studio album which peaked at number 49 on the Australian charts in 1983.

The Runners toured constantly throughout the early eighties and went through many line up changes before disbanding in 1985.

Discography

Albums

Singles

References

Australian pop music groups
Musical groups established in 1980
Musical groups disestablished in 1985